is a sub-kilometer asteroid classified as near-Earth object and potentially hazardous asteroid of the Apollo group. It was discovered on 31 January 2003 by the LINEAR program. , its orbit is based on 170 observations spanning a data-arc of 939 days.

It comes to within 0.05 AU of Earth periodically. It is also an Earth crosser and a Mars crosser.

See also 
 99942 Apophis

Notes

  This is assuming an albedo of 0.25–0.05.

References

External links
  data at MPC
 List of Potentially Hazardous Asteroids (PHAs) MPC
 
 
 

Minor planet object articles (unnumbered)
Earth-crossing asteroids

20030131